The 2014 AFL season was the 118th season of the Australian Football League (AFL), the highest level senior Australian rules football competition in Australia, which was known as the Victorian Football League until 1989. The season featured eighteen clubs, ran from 14 March until 27 September, and comprised a 22-game home-and-away season followed by a finals series featuring the top eight clubs.

The premiership was won by the Hawthorn Football Club for the twelfth time and second time consecutively, after it defeated  by 63 points in the 2014 AFL Grand Final.

Pre-season

NAB Challenge

The AFL abandoned the NAB Cup competition, replacing it with the NAB Challenge series. The NAB challenge featured 18 practice matches played over 18 consecutive days, beginning 12 February and ending 1 March; the matches were stand-alone in nature, with no overall winner crowned for the series. Each team played two pre-season games, many of which were played at suburban or regional venues; all games were televised on Fox Footy. There had been a proposal to conclude the pre-season with an All-Star representative match, replacing the NAB Cup Grand Final as the centrepiece of the preseason, but this did not go ahead. The Super Goal was retained for these matches.

Premiership season
The full fixture was released on Thursday 31 October 2013, and the premiership season was launched at the redeveloped Adelaide Oval in South Australia on 5 March. Notable features of the draw included:
  played most of its home games at night in 2014, with its first game played against  on a Thursday night in round 1.
 The Melbourne Cricket Ground was unavailable for round 1 due to cricket commitments.
The AFL trialled five Sunday night matches during the season, two of which were televised on the Seven Network.
Traeger Park in Alice Springs hosted its first premiership match when  met  in round 11.
 Match starting times are local.

Round 1

Round 2

Round 3

Round 4

Round 5

Round 6

Round 7

Round 8

Round 9

Round 10

Round 11

Round 12

Round 13

Round 14

Round 15

Round 16

Round 17

Round 18

Round 19

Round 20

Round 21

Round 22

Round 23

Win/loss table

Bold – Home game
X – Bye
Opponent for round listed above margin

Ladder

Ladder progression

Finals series

Week one

Week two

Week three

Week four

Attendances

By club

By ground

Awards
The Norm Smith Medal was awarded to Luke Hodge of 
The AFL Players Association awards
The AFL Coaches Association Awards
The Lifetime Achievement Award was awarded to Neale Daniher.
The Media Award was awarded to Gerard Whateley for his work on Fox Footy.

Milestones

Coleman Medal

Best and fairest

Club leadership

Club financials

Coach changes

Post-season

International Rules Series

The International Rules Series returned for 2014 at the later time of November. Ahead of the series, the AFL adopted a new rule permitting only those who had been selected in an All-Australian team in their careers playing for the Australian team. The series was also reduced to a single test match and several rule changes were made so as to enable greater participation from key position players in the AFL. Australia defeated Ireland by 10 points, 56–46, to claim their first win in International rules football since the 2010 series.

Notable events
On 3 March 2014, it was announced that CEO of the AFL, Andrew Demetriou, would be resigning from the post following the conclusion of the season, after eleven years in the role. Gillon McLachlan was later named his successor.
On 13 May 2014, Greater Western Sydney midfielder Toby Greene was charged with a number of offences including assault with a dangerous weapon and intentionally causing serious injury over an alleged assault in a Melbourne licensed venue the previous night. He was later suspended by the club for five weeks.
Just a year after being racially abused in a match against , 's Adam Goodes was once again the target of a racial vilification, this time by an  supporter. While the incident went unheard during the weekend, it only came to light on 20 May 2014; the Essendon club responded by terminating that supporter's membership.
On 26 May 2014, Hawthorn head coach Alastair Clarkson was hospitalised after being diagnosed with Guillain–Barré syndrome. Brendon Bolton was appointed as the acting head coach for a couple of months while Clarkson recovered.
As part of the ongoing investigation into the Essendon Football Club supplements controversy, on 13 June 2014, the Australian Sports Anti-Doping Authority (ASADA) issued show cause notices to 34 Essendon players from its 2012 list. In response, Essendon executives lodged a Federal Court application alleging that ASADA's joint investigation with the AFL was unlawful and in breach of the ASADA Act. On 19 September, Justice John Middleton ruled that ASADA's investigation was lawful, allowing ASADA to trigger the start of the show-cause response period, which gives charged players 14 days to answer doping allegations against them.

References

Australian Football League seasons
 
2014 in Australian rules football